Beixinjing is a station on Line 2 of the Shanghai Metro in Changning District. It is within walking distance of the Brilliance West shopping mall.

References

Line 2, Shanghai Metro
Shanghai Metro stations in Changning District
Railway stations in China opened in 2006
Railway stations in Shanghai